Phinehas Barnes (January 21, 1811August 21, 1871) was an American lawyer, newspaper editor, and politician from Maine. Barnes was born in Orland, Maine before attending Bowdoin College. After graduating from Bowdoin, he taught at Waterville College. He eventually moved to Portland and was elected to five single-year terms in the Maine House of Representatives (18441846; 1848; 1856). He also edited the Whig-leaning newspaper the Portland Advertiser and worked as an attorney for a number of years and represented among other companies the Grand Trunk Railway. He is buried at Portland's Evergreen Cemetery.

References

1811 births
1871 deaths
Writers from Portland, Maine
Lawyers from Portland, Maine
Politicians from Portland, Maine
People from Orland, Maine
Bowdoin College alumni
Colby College faculty
Members of the Maine House of Representatives
Journalists from Maine
Maine lawyers
19th-century American newspaper editors
Maine Whigs
19th-century American lawyers